Chrysolophus is a genus of the pheasant family of birds. The genus name is from Ancient Greek khrusolophos, "with golden crest".

These are species which have spectacularly plumaged males. The golden pheasant is native to western China, and Lady Amherst's pheasant to Tibet and westernmost China, but both have been widely introduced elsewhere.  In places where self-supporting feral populations have become established, such as England, the two species will interbreed to produce hybrids.

Despite the male's showy appearance, these birds are very difficult to see in their natural habitat, which is dense, dark, young conifer forests with sparse undergrowth. Consequently, little is known of their behaviour in the wild.

They feed on the ground on grain, leaves and invertebrates, but roost in trees at night. Whilst they can fly, they prefer to run: but if startled they can suddenly burst upwards at great speed, with a distinctive wing sound.

Extant species

References

 
Bird genera
Taxa named by John Edward Gray